Jancarlos de Oliveira Barros  or simply  Jancarlos  (August 15, 1983 – November 22, 2013) was a Brazilian footballer who last played for Ituano.

Career
Jancarlos was born in Natividade. In January 2010 the 26-year-old defender, having spent the previous year at Cruzeiro, signed a two-year deal with Botafogo. He played from 2005 to 2009 for São Paulo.

Honours
Fluminense
Rio de Janeiro State League: 2002

Atlético Paranaense
Paraná State League: 2005

São Paulo
Brazilian League: 2008

External links
 CBF
 sambafoot.com
 furacao.com
 rubronegro.net
 youtube.com
 zerozero.pt

References

1983 births
2013 deaths
Brazilian footballers
Fluminense FC players
Club Athletico Paranaense players
Esporte Clube Juventude players
Esporte Clube Bahia players
Botafogo de Futebol e Regatas players
Cruzeiro Esporte Clube players
São Paulo FC players
Campeonato Brasileiro Série A players
Road incident deaths in Brazil
Accidental deaths in Brazil
Association football defenders